Horia Alexandru Crișan (born 27 June 1991) is a Romanian professional footballer who plays as a defender. Crișan made his Liga I debut on 27 April 2014 for Dinamo București in a 3-1 win against Concordia Chiajna. He started his career at Viitorul Constanța and also played in the Liga II for several teams: Juventus București, Fortuna Poiana Câmpina, Șoimii Pâncota or Sportul Snagov. Crișan played in Hungary for Putnok and Vasas and in Lithuania for Kruoja Pakruojis.

References

External links
 
 

1991 births
Living people
People from Turda
Romanian footballers
Association football defenders
FC Unirea Urziceni players
Liga I players
Liga II players
A Lyga players
Moldovan Super Liga players
FC Brașov (1936) players
FC Dinamo București players
FC Viitorul Constanța players
ASC Daco-Getica București players
CS Șoimii Pâncota players
CS Sportul Snagov players
CS Știința Miroslava players
Putnok VSE footballers
Vasas SC players
Speranța Nisporeni players
Romanian expatriate footballers
Romanian expatriate sportspeople in Hungary
Expatriate footballers in Hungary
Romanian expatriate sportspeople in Lithuania
Expatriate footballers in Lithuania
Romanian expatriate sportspeople in Moldova
Expatriate footballers in Moldova